Riegel may refer to:

 Riegel (surname)
 Riegel (glacial), ridges of bedrock that have been exposed by glacial erosion
 Riegel am Kaiserstuhl, German municipality in the district of Emmendingen in Baden-Württemberg
 Riegelsville, Pennsylvania
 New Riegel, Ohio

See also 
 Rigel (disambiguation)

ar:ريجل